WQPO (100.7 FM) is a Contemporary Hit Radio formatted broadcast radio station licensed to Harrisonburg, Virginia, serving the Central Shenandoah Valley.  WQPO is owned and operated by Saga Communications.

HD Radio
WQPO-HD3 was launched in early 2016, carrying a classic rock format branded as "V100.1; Iconic Rock". WQPO-HD3 is relayed by W261CV on 100.1 in Harrisonburg, from which it derived its branding. On the morning of May 9, 2018, WQPO-HD3 flipped from classic rock to soft adult contemporary, branded as "EZ Favorites 100.1".

WQPO-HD2 flipped from a simulcast of sports WHBG (1360 AM) to original programming as oldies-formatted "Pure Oldies 101.3" on May 25, 2018.

References

External links
Q-101 Online

Contemporary hit radio stations in the United States
QPO
Radio stations established in 1946
1946 establishments in Virginia